Abibus of Samosata (died 297) was a Christian martyr at Samosata (in Syria on the River Euphrates). He lived during the period of Diocletianic Persecution. He was arrested for refusing to take part in a pagan ritual to celebrate the victory of Emperor Maximian over the Persians. He was thrown to prison where his body was scratched with iron, he had heavy shackles over his neck. In 297 he was sentenced to be executed by crucifixion. After having lived for two days on the cross, he was taken down and his head was pierced by nails. He was crucified together with other martyrs – James, Romanus, Lollius, Philotheus and Paregrus. All these martyrs were commemorated on 29 January in the Byzantine Church and by the Armenian Church in October.

His feast day is kept on December 9.

References

External sources

Holweck, F. G. A Biographical Dictionary of the Saints. St. Louis, MO: B. Herder Book Co. 1924.
 
 Matthew Bunson, Encyclopedia of Saints, Second Edition 2nd ed. Edition(2014). Publisher: Our Sunday Visitor; 2nd ed. edition, 
 Ramsgate Benedictine Monks of St.Augustine's Abbey, The Book of Saints (Reference) (2002). Publisher: A & C Black Publishers Ltd; 7th edition, 

3rd-century births
297 deaths
Mesopotamian saints
3rd-century Christian martyrs
Christians martyred during the reign of Diocletian